Étienne Azambre (2 February 1859, Paris -21 June 1933, Paris) was a French painter, best known for his religious and genre scenes, done in a subdued manner.

Life & work
His father was a lawyer. After attending the Collège Stanislas de Paris, he decided to become an artist. From 1879 to 1882, he was enrolled at the Académie Julian, then attended the École Nationale des Beaux-Arts until 1885, where he studied with William Bouguereau and Tony Robert-Fleury. During his military duty in Orléans, he made lifelong friends with the painters Lucien Simon and Georges Desvallières.

Between 1883 and 1904, he exhibited regularly at the Salon des Artistes français In 1889, he participated in the annual exhibition held by the Friends of Art of the Département of Seine-et-Oise, which was held at the Château de Versailles.

His religious works could also be seen at several artistic exhibitions organized by the Rosicrucians. Many of his works were reproduced as illustrations in magazines such as Le Monde Illustré, La Famille and La France Illustrée.

In 1895, he was one of the artists chosen to decorate the Church of Sainte Marie-Madeleine of Équennes-Éramecourt in Somme. He created frescoes that adorn the cupola, representing the Coronation of the Virgin in the presence of a large assembly of angels. This helped him establish a relationship with the publisher, which specialized in religious items. He eventually provided hundreds of pious images, many for postcards, reproduced by lithography, rotogravure and chromolithography. He focused entirely on scenes from the New Testament.

Following his death, in 1933, he was interred in a nearby cemetery.

References

Further reading 
 Enzo Pagliara, Étienne Azambre: un pittore per la religione : immaginette d'autore tra Otto e Novecento, Barbieri, 2003

External links 

More works by Azambre @ ArtNet
"Étienne Azambre, le peintre des Anges", a website by Franz Torres-Quevedo

1859 births
1933 deaths
19th-century French painters
Religious painters
French genre painters
Painters from Paris
20th-century French painters